The whitechin surgeonfish (Acanthurus albimento) is a species of fish in the family Acanthuridae. It was described by Kent E. Carpenter, Jeffrey Taylor Williams and Mudjekeewis Dalisay Santos in 2017. It is a tropical fish which inhabits reefs around the Philippines. Both its common name and species epithet refer to the white colouring on its chin.

References

Fish described in 2017
Acanthuridae